Clarkson's Farm is a British television documentary series about Jeremy Clarkson and his farm in the Cotswolds. The first season was released by Amazon Prime Video on 11 June 2021. The series documents Clarkson's attempts at running a  farm in the Cotswolds, and it has received largely positive reviews. In July 2021, it was renewed for a second series which was released on 10 February 2023. In October 2022, the programme was renewed for a third series.

Diddly Squat Farm
The farm was formerly part of the Sarsden estate in Oxfordshire. Jeremy Clarkson bought about a thousand acres (4 km2) in 2008, including Curdle Hill Farm. The fields were mostly arable, growing a rotation of barley, rapeseed and wheat. These were farmed on a contract basis by a local villager named Howard until his retirement in 2019. Clarkson then decided to attempt the challenge of farming the land himself.

The farm was renamed "Diddly Squat" by Clarkson to indicate its lack of productivity, as diddly squat is slang for "the least amount" or "nothing".

Cast

Main cast
 Jeremy Clarkson: a motoring journalist, television presenter and author who became famous as the host of Top Gear and later on The Grand Tour. Having moved to Oxfordshire, he became part of the Chipping Norton set and the owner of newly renamed Diddly Squat Farm.
 Kaleb Cooper: a young farm worker born in Chipping Norton in 1998. Cooper farms on his own account in Heythrop, but was engaged by Clarkson to assist him. He has previous experience working on Clarkson's farm before Clarkson took over as the owner. He mainly advises Clarkson on the technical details of using farming equipment and helps with numerous general tasks. He has rarely left the village of Chadlington and its surrounding areas, with the furthest place he regularly travels to being Banbury and has never travelled abroad.
 Lisa Hogan: an actress and Clarkson's girlfriend who assists with the farm and runs the farm shop.
 Charlie Ireland: sarcastically referred to by Clarkson as "Cheerful Charlie", Ireland is a professional agronomist and land agent who advises Clarkson on farm management. He understands the agricultural aspects of the crops, the complex details of government regulation and the financial consequences. Rachael Sigee, writing for the i newspaper, described him as "chronically sensible ... a stickler for the rules who delivers increasingly bad news with the politely firm manners of a parish vicar."
 Gerald Cooper: no relation to Kaleb Cooper, he is the farm's "head of security" and a specialist in the construction and maintenance of dry stone walls, which form 40 miles of boundaries on the farm. His conversations with Clarkson are amiable but often incomprehensible due to his strong West Country accent. He helps Clarkson harvest the farm's grain, which he has been doing for over fifty years.
 Kevin Harrison (series 1): the chairman of the National Sheep Association and a veteran sheep farmer who advises Clarkson on purchasing and later tending to his flock of sheep.
 Ellen Helliwell (series 1): the shepherdess engaged by Clarkson to tend the flock of sheep which he acquired to graze his set-aside meadows. Her duties include lambing and shearing.
 Alan Townsend (series 2; guest series 1): the head builder for various projects on the farm including the farm shop, barns for the farm animals and the farm restaurant.
 Dilwyn Evans (series 2; guest series 1): a local veterinarian who helps care for the farm's flock of sheep and later its cows. He performs various tasks including checking the animals for diseases and assisting with the birth of calves.

Other cast
 Georgia Craig: a policy advisor from the National Farmer's Union who advises Clarkson.
 Viktor Zaichenko: a Ukrainian beekeeper who sells honey bees to Clarkson and helps manage the farm's apiary.
 Simon Strong: a neighbouring grain farmer who rents a combine harvester to Clarkson.
 Tim and Katy Coles (series 2): local cow breeders who sell heifers and beef cattle to Clarkson and later rent him a bull.
 Paddy and Steph Bourn (series 2): local egg farmers known as "Mr and Mrs Cacklebean" who sell hens, chicken coops and cockerels to Clarkson.
 Emma Ledbury (series 2): a local dairy farmer who lost half her herd of dairy cattle to bovine tuberculosis and provides the farm shop with milk products.
 Pip Lacey (series 2): a professional chef hired to run the farm restaurant.

Episodes

Overview

Season 1 (2021)

Season 2 (2023)

Season 3
The show was commissioned for a third season in October 2022.

Reception
On Farming Today, Clarkson said that he listens to the BBC programme's podcast.  The opinion of the active farmers interviewed was favourable. 

Other farmers were also reported to have shown an "overwhelmingly favourable" reaction to Clarkson's Farm. The sheep farmer James Rebanks said that the farming community "all loved that programme", and that Clarkson had done more for farming in one series than 30 years of the BBC's long-running farming programme Countryfile. Viewers have found the programme educational and entertaining, and that "they now feel much better informed about farming". The National Farmer's Union has awarded Clarkson 2021 Farming Champion of the Year as "a vocal champion for the British farming industry", and producing that year a show that showcased the realities of farming and one that "has really resonated with the public". Clarkson and his farm assistant Kaleb Cooper won the Flying the Flag for British Agriculture award at the British Farming Awards.

Joel Golby, reviewing for The Guardian, found Clarkson's verbal signalling of his jokes by lowering his voice tiring, but the format, in which his blunders are corrected by no-nonsense country folk, works well, "It's simply, just ... really good TV". Lucy Mangan wrote a different review for The Guardian a week later, but only gave it one star out of five.  She was tired by Clarkson's role as an ignorant buffoon and called the show "wearisome, meretricious rubbish ... The series amounts to less and less as time goes on."

Anita Singh reviewed the show for The Daily Telegraph. She liked the apparent authenticity of Clarkson's involvement in the farming, "...when you see Clarkson despairing at his crop failures, or yelping with delight when he helps to deliver a lamb, it feels genuine."  She liked the supporting players, such as Kaleb and Charlie, and that "Clarkson’s gone soft, and it makes for surprisingly good viewing."

Suzi Feay gave the show five stars in the Financial Times. She especially liked "...some of rural England’s more surprising characters ... Clarkson’s Farm features some unique types that are rarely spotted on screen."

Hugo Rifkind, reviewing for The Times, likes Clarkson's "honesty of self" and appreciated both the good fun and the increasingly earnest engagement, "...you get to watch a familiar face grow smitten with his new life, coming to understand the responsibility of feeding Britain ... a quite lovely documentary series about life on a farm..."

Marty Meany reviewed Clarkson's Farm for Goosed.ie, describing Jeremy as a "grown man playing Farming Simulator in real life", but whether you "love him or hate him, Clarkson’s Farm sees Jeremy return to his very best" after years of creating "blatantly scripted" television. Meany gave the show four and a half stars in his review.

Following the release of the show on Amazon, the show was a popular success online, being rated five stars on Google.

Clarkson faced a severe backlash from the people of Chadlington over the opening of the farm shop, which resulted in a  traffic jam and necessitated the attendance of the police to handle the disruption in traffic. Later that day he took to Twitter, writing: "People of Chadlington. I’m truly sorry about the traffic around our farm shop last weekend. We are doing everything we can to improve the situation".

References

External links
 Clarkson's Farm – Season 1 at Amazon
 

2021 British television series debuts
2020s British documentary television series
English-language television shows
Amazon Prime Video original programming
Television shows about agriculture
Television shows set in Oxfordshire
Television series by Amazon Studios
Television shows set on farms